

Abgar VIII of Edessa, also known as Abgar the Great or Abgar bar Ma'nu, was an Arab king of  Osroene from 177 CE to 212 CE.

Abgar the Great was most remembered for his alleged conversion to Christianity in about 200 CE and the declaration of Christianity as the official religion of the city at that time.  It has been suggested that a cross shown on the tiara of Abgar VIII in coins he minted has a Christian meaning.

Osroene was a client state of the Roman Empire at this time. Prior to Abgar VIII taking the throne, in  the Roman military had reinstated Abgar VII, and they continued to have a significant presence in the region. Nevertheless,  Abgar VIII's initial actions suggest that he was not wholly loyal to Rome nor was closely monitored by Rome. While Abgar VIII's coins bear the image of the Roman Emperor Commodus, Abgar's goals were to maintain a degree of independence and to extend his influence geographically as much as possible without disturbing the greater powers of Rome and Parthia.

However Pescennius Niger was swiftly challenged and deposed by the Emperor Septimius Severus. Abgar VIII's submission to Septimus Severus is portrayed on the Arch of Severus in Rome. He was not deposed, but Osroene was made a Roman province and Abgar's kingdom was reduced to a rump state containing just the city of Edessa. Abgar was fully reconciled with Septimus Severus and was later received with honour as a guest of Septimus Severus in Rome. In an additional display of loyalty, Abgar VIII took on the Latin name Lucius Aelius Aurelius Septimus.

Christianity spread in Edessa significantly during Abgar VIII's reign. The Chronicle of Edessa reports that a Christian church building in Edessa was damaged in a flood in November . The Christian philosopher Bardaisan was a member of Abgar VIII's court. 

In 1904 Adolf von Harnack proposed that Lucius of Britain, a ruler mentioned in the Liber Pontificalis as contemporaneous with Pope Eleutherius, actually was Abgar of Edessa. Harnack argued that 'Britanio' was written as an erroneous expansion for 'Britio', a citadel of Edessa. Harnack's proposal has been challenged by British archaeologist David J. Knight, who argued that Abgar of Edessa was never called Lucius of Britio/Birtha in contemporary sources.

Upon his death in 212 CE, Abgar the Great was succeeded by his son Abgar IX. However, Abgar IX was summoned with his son to Rome in 213 CE and murdered on the orders of Caracalla. A year later Caracalla ended the independence of Osroene and incorporated it as a province into Roman Empire.

See also 
Abgar V

Notes

Citations

References

Further reading 

 

Year of birth unknown
2nd-century Arabs
3rd-century Arabs
3rd-century Christians
212 deaths
Kings of Osroene
Syriac Christians